In Greek mythology, Phalanx is a minor Attic figure, who features in a lesser-known narrative of the myth of Arachne, the girl who enraged the goddess Athena by boasting of being a better weaver than her and was thus transformed into a spider by Athena. In this version of the story, Phalanx is Arachne's brother, and they are both punished by the goddess when they break a societal taboo.

Etymology 
In Liddell & Scott the Greek word , usually used to mean the phalanx (a clustered mass of infantry), can refer among other things to beams, the bone between joints in fingers and toes, round pieces of wood, trunk or logs and generally beam-shaped objects (like a spider's legs). It is related to the word  (phalángion, literally 'little phalanx') which is the ancient Greek word for a venomous spider.

Family 
Phalanx was the brother of Arachne, thus possibly the son of Idmon, a famous purple dyer from Colophon.

Mythology 
In the most known and traditional version of the tale, recorded in Ovid's Metamorphoses, the Lydian maiden Arachne is the (apparently brotherless) child of Idmon. An exceptional weaver, she boasts of being even more talented than even Athena, the goddess of weaving. The goddess challenges the girl to a weaving match, and though Arachne's weaving work is without a flaw, Athena is enraged at its subject, as Arachne wove the male gods seducing and tricking mortal women. Athena rips the work to shreds, and Arachne in distress hangs herself. In pity, Athena changes her into a spider, so she can live again, and still practice her art.

But in a much more obscure version, saved by a scholiast on Nicander and attributed to Theophilus, a writer of the school of Zenodotus who lived during the third century BC, Arachne was an Attic maiden instead who had a brother named Phalanx. Athena taught Phalanx the art of war, and Arachne the art of weaving. But when the two siblings engaged in an incestuous relationship and laid with each other, they disgusted Athena, who turned them into 'animals doomed to be eaten by their own young', presumably spiders given the more popular tale and the meaning of Phalanx and Arachne's names.

Ovid drew a lot from Nicander's now lost works for his Metamorphoses, but if he had heard of the this twist in Arachne's character, he chose to omit it. Perhaps he did so because that particular version of the myth might not have been familiar enough among a predominately Roman audience. That being said, there is no evidence that Nicander himself knew about this version either.

Interpretation 
This tale, typical of the sort of Nicander's myths that Antoninus Liberalis collected, explains how a particular animal came to be from a transformed human, but also how some of said animals' most prominent features mirror the behaviour exhibited by the humans before their eventual transformation. Unlike Ovid's telling, which places Arachne in Asia Minor, this version is given a home in Attica. This is probably because, while phalangion was used everywhere to mean 'spider', the non-diminutive form phalanx was applied to spiders only in Attica.

In the story, Phalanx serves as a failed representative of Athenian young men, just as Arachne is a failed representative of Athenian maidens and their potential; weaving and military skills were seen as the proper pursuits for youth of each gender, as was a properly controlled sexual urge. Phalanx and Arachne fail not because of any lack of skill on their parts, but rather because they could not control themselves.

The male sibling being taught about the craft of war provides an aetiological connection to the phalanx (as in the military formation), while the female one being instructed in the art of weaving provides a similar connection to spiders weaving their webs. Salzman-Mitchell suggested that perhaps the moral of this myth is that masculine arts (war) should not be mixed with feminine ones (weaving).

See also 

 Byblis
 Gale
 Ictinus
 Proetus

References

Bibliography 
 
 
 
 
  Online version at Perseus.tufts project.
 
 
 
 

Metamorphoses into arthropods in Greek mythology
Deeds of Athena
Attican characters in Greek mythology
Incest in Greek mythology